Achnahaird Bay is an inlet of Enard Bay and is located on the Coigach peninsula, Wester Ross, Scotland. It can be reached by following the road to the scattered settlement of Achiltibuie. The wide sandy beach has views of the mountains Stac Pollaidh, Canisp and Suilven. Achnahaird Bay was used as a filming location for the 2011 film The Eagle, with a horse chase scene across the beach.

There is a caravan site near the beach.

References

Ross and Cromarty
Bays of Highland (council area)